The Piaggio P.148 was a 1950s Italian two-seat primary or aerobatic training monoplane designed and built by Piaggio Aero.

Design and development
The P.148 was an all-metal low-wing cantilever monoplane with fixed tailwheel landing gear. It offered room for two occupants in side-by-side seating as well as an optional third seat. The prototype first flew on the 12 February 1951 and after testing by the Italian Air Force was ordered into production for the air force primary training schools. A four-seat variant was developed as the P.149.

Operational history
Although successfully introduced into the Italian Air Force service, the P.148 was withdrawn from use with the introduction of an all-jet training programme. In 1970, the aircraft was re-introduced into the Italian Air Force Service, when the basic piston-engine aircraft regained a role in the selection of pilots. Some aircraft were sold by the Air Force to the Somali Air Corps as trainers.

Operators

 Italian Air Force   operated 70 aircraft from 1951 until 1979

 Somali Air Corps - Retired

Specifications (P.148)

See also

References

 
 The Illustrated Encyclopedia of Aircraft (Part Work 1982-1985), 1985, Orbis Publishing, Page 2714

P.148
1950s Italian military trainer aircraft
Aircraft first flown in 1951
Low-wing aircraft
Single-engined tractor aircraft